Banfora is a city in south western Burkina Faso, with a population of 117,452 (2019 census) making it the sixth most populous city in Burkina Faso. It is the capital of the Comoe province. The Cascades de Karfiguéla are a series of waterfalls close to Banfora.

History

The first settlers were the Karaboro who with the Gouin and Turkas constitute the city's main ethnic groups. They are all from the south of Burkina Faso.

In 1903 the French colonialist forces created a military post at Banfora and one year later created an administrative position there. In 1905 a road was built linking Banfora to Bobo-Dioulasso and in 1931 a railway was built to the town.

Economy
The economy has grown around the sugar cane industry. The city is also an important market town and there are hotels which support a small tourism industry linked to the Cascades de Karfiguéla.

Transportation

The city has a railroad station along the Abidjan – Ouagadougou Railway. As of June 2014 Sitarail operated a passenger train along the line three times a week in each direction. It is a way station for transport to and from Côte d'Ivoire as it is the last city in Burkina Faso before the border. The paved road from Bobo-Dioulasso continues to the border and cargo will often stop at Niangoloko before reaching customs.

Education
Banfora has 19 primary schools, two high schools, four private colleges and the College of Sainte Thérèse.

Healthcare
The city has a regional hospital (CHR), a maternal and infant protection unit and three pharmacies. Traditional medicine is also practiced and there is a center for traditional therapies.

Demographics
The main ethnic groups are the Gouin, the Karaboro and the Turka. The most commonly used languages for communication between people of different ethnicities living in Banfora are Dioula and French.

Climate 
Köppen-Geiger climate classification system classifies its climate as tropical wet and dry (Aw).

References 

Populated places in the Cascades Region